Kardzhali Point (‘Nos Kardzhali’ \'nos 'k&r-dzha-li\) is the rocky point forming the south side of the entrance to Ograzhden Cove on the northwest coast of Ray Promontory of Byers Peninsula, Livingston Island in the South Shetland Islands, Antarctica. It is situated 680 m south of Essex Point, 1.23 km east-northeast of Isbul Point and 1.98 km east-northeast of Start Point.

The feature is part of the Antarctic Specially Protected Area ASPA 126 Byers Peninsula, situated in one of its restricted zones.

The point is named after the town of Kardzhali in southern Bulgaria.

Location
British mapping in 1968, Spanish in 1993 and Bulgarian in 2009.

Maps
 Península Byers, Isla Livingston. Mapa topográfico a escala 1:25000. Madrid: Servicio Geográfico del Ejército, 1992.
 L.L. Ivanov. Antarctica: Livingston Island and Greenwich, Robert, Snow and Smith Islands. Scale 1:120000 topographic map. Troyan: Manfred Wörner Foundation, 2010.  (First edition 2009. )
 Antarctic Digital Database (ADD). Scale 1:250000 topographic map of Antarctica. Scientific Committee on Antarctic Research (SCAR). Since 1993, regularly upgraded and updated.
 L.L. Ivanov. Antarctica: Livingston Island and Smith Island. Scale 1:100000 topographic map. Manfred Wörner Foundation, 2017.

Notes

References
 Bulgarian Antarctic Gazetteer. Antarctic Place-names Commission. (details in Bulgarian, basic data in English)

External links
 Kardzhali Point. Copernix satellite image

Headlands of Livingston Island
Bulgaria and the Antarctic